This is a list of rivers in the U.S. state of Idaho.

By drainage basin
This list is arranged by drainage basin, with respective tributaries indented under each larger stream's name.

Pacific Ocean
Columbia River (WA)
Snake River
Palouse River
Union Flat Creek
Clearwater River
Lapwai Creek
Potlatch River
Pine Creek
Big Bear Creek
Moose Creek
Big Canyon Creek
North Fork Clearwater River
Elk Creek
Little North Fork Clearwater River
Beaver Creek
Washington Creek (Idaho)
Orogrande Creek
French Creek
Weitas Creek
Fourth of July Creek
Kelly Creek
Orofino Creek
Whiskey Creek
Canal Gulch
Jim Ford Creek
Lolo Creek
Lawyers Creek
Middle Fork Clearwater River
Lochsa River
White Sand Creek (meets the Lochsa near Powell Junction)
Selway River (meets the Lochsa at Lowell)
Meadow Creek
Moose Creek
North Fork Moose Creek
East Fork Moose Creek
Bear Creek
White Cap Creek
Little Clearwater River
South Fork Clearwater River
Cottonwood Creek
Crooked River
American River
Red River
Salmon River
Tower Creek
Little Salmon River
Rapid River
South Fork Salmon River
Secesh River
East Fork South Fork Salmon River
Johnson Creek
Middle Fork Salmon River
Big Creek
Camas Creek
Loon Creek
Panther Creek
North Fork Salmon River
Lemhi River
Pahsimeroi River
East Fork Salmon River
Yankee Fork Salmon River
Wildhorse River
Crooked River
Weiser River
Crane Creek
Little Weiser River
Payette River
Big Willow Creek
Little Willow Creek
Dry Creek
Fourmile Creek
Jakes Creek
Chief Eagle Eye  Creek
North Fork Payette River
Gold Fork River
Middle Fork Payette River
South Fork Payette River
Deadwood River
Boise River
Indian Creek
Mores Creek
South Fork Boise River
Boardman Creek
Deadwood Creek
Middle Fork Boise River
Roaring River
Queens River
Yuba River
North Fork Boise River
Crooked River
Bear River
Owyhee River
Jordan Creek
North Fork Owyhee River
Middle Fork Owyhee River
South Fork Owyhee River
Little Owyhee River
Deep Creek
Battle Creek
Blue Creek
Castle Creek
Bruneau River
Jacks Creek
Big Jacks Creek
Little Jacks Creek
Clover Creek
Sheep Creek
Marys Creek
Jarbidge River
Sailor Creek
Malad River
Big Wood River
Camas Creek
Little Wood River
Baugh Creek
Salmon Falls Creek
Goose Creek
Raft River
Rock Creek
Bannock Creek
Portneuf River
Marsh Creek
Blackfoot River
Willow Creek
Grays Lake Outlet
Henrys Fork
Teton River
Moody Creek
Canyon Creek
Bitch Creek
Badger Creek
Fall River
Conant Creek
Squirrel Creek
Boone Creek
Warm River
Robinson Creek
Buffalo River
Moose Creek
Spokane River
Latah Creek
Coeur d'Alene River
South Fork Coeur d'Alene River
North Fork Coeur d'Alene River
Saint Joe River
Saint Maries River
Pend Oreille River
Priest River
Pack River
Clark Fork
Kootenai River
Balboa River
Moyie River

Interior basins
These basins are hydrologically linked to the Snake River.

Big Lost River
Antelope Creek
East Fork Big Lost River
North Fork Big Lost River
Little Lost River
Birch Creek
Medicine Lodge Creek
Camas Creek
Beaver Creek

Great Basin
Great Salt Lake
Bear River
Malad River
Little Malad River
Little Bear River
Logan River
Cub River
Deep Creek

Alphabetically

See also

List of rivers in the United States
List of lakes in Idaho
List of mountains of Idaho

References
USGS Geographic Names Information System
USGS Hydrologic Unit Map - State of Idaho (1974)

Idaho

Rivers